The 2008 United States presidential election in Rhode Island took place on November 4, 2008, and was part of the 2008 United States presidential election. Voters chose four representatives, or electors to the Electoral College, who voted for president and vice president.

Rhode Island was won by Democratic nominee Barack Obama with a 27.8% margin of victory. Prior to the election, all 17 news organizations considered this a state Obama would win, or otherwise considered as a safe blue state. The last time a Republican carried this state or any county in the state was in 1984, when Ronald Reagan won with about 52% of the vote, largely due to the support of Reagan Democrats.

As of 2020, this was the last time the town of West Greenwich voted for the Democratic candidate in a presidential election.

Primaries
 2008 Rhode Island Democratic presidential primary
 2008 Rhode Island Republican presidential primary

Campaign

Predictions 
There were 16 news organizations who made state-by-state predictions of the election. Here are their last predictions before election day:

Polling

Obama won every single pre-election poll, and each by a double-digit margin of victory. The final 3 polls averaged Obama leading with 51% to 33%.

Fundraising
John McCain raised a total of $343,965 in the state. Barack Obama raised $1,563,473.

Advertising and visits
Obama and his interest groups spent $671,623. McCain spent nothing. The Democratic ticket visited the state once, while the Republican ticket didn't visit the state at all.

Analysis
Rhode Island had historically supported a Republican candidate until 1908, but has supported Democrats all but seven times in the 24 elections that have followed. In 1980, Rhode Island was one of only six states to vote against Ronald Reagan. Reagan did carry Rhode Island in his 49-state victory in 1984—only the third time since Eisenhower that a Republican won state. However, Reagan's 3.6% margin was his second-closest in the nation, ahead of only his 2.8% margin in neighboring Massachusetts. Despite George H. W. Bush aggressively contesting the state in 1988, Michael Dukakis won it by a fairly convincing 13 points, his best performance. The state has not been seriously contested since then, often giving Democratic presidential nominees their biggest margins. It was Bill Clinton's second-best state in 1996 (behind only Massachusetts) and Al Gore's best state in 2000. In 2004, Rhode Island gave John Kerry more than a 20% margin of victory (the third-highest of any state), with 59.4% of its vote. All but three of Rhode Island's 39 cities and towns voted for the Democratic candidate. The only exceptions were East Greenwich, West Greenwich and Scituate.

This pattern continued in 2008. Rhode Island gave Barack Obama a 27.80% margin of victory with 62.86% of its vote. The Ocean State was Obama's third-strongest state nationwide, only outperforming in Hawaii and Vermont. Every single county in Rhode Island, along with Massachusetts, New Hampshire, Vermont, Connecticut, and Hawaii, voted for the former U.S. Senator from Illinois in 2008. Obama also won every town in Rhode Island with the exception of Scituate along with both congressional districts. Independent Ralph Nader had one of his best performances here in 2008 obtaining over 1% of the vote.

Having some of the highest taxes in the nation, Rhode Island is considered to be a liberal bastion. In addition, Rhode Island has abolished capital punishment, making it one of 15 states that have done so. Rhode Island abolished the death penalty very early, just after Michigan (the first state to abolish it), and carried out its last execution in the 1840s. At the time of the 2008 presidential election, Rhode Island was one of two states (along with Nevada) in which prostitution was legal (provided it took place indoors).

During the same election, incumbent Democratic U.S. Senator Jack Reed was soundly reelected over Republican Bob Tingle in a landslide three-to-one margin and won every town in the state including Scituate. Reed received 73.07% of the vote while Tingle took in 26.47% (with write-ins obtaining the remaining 0.45%). At the state level, Democrats picked up nine seats in the Rhode Island House of Representatives to augment their supermajority in that chamber.

Results

By county

By congressional district
Barack Obama carried both of Rhode Island's 2 congressional districts.

Electors

Technically the voters of Rhode Island cast their ballots for electors: representatives to the Electoral College. Rhode Island is allocated 4 electors because it has 2 congressional districts and 2 senators. All candidates who appear on the ballot or qualify to receive write-in votes must submit a list of 4 electors, who pledge to vote for their candidate and his or her running mate. Whoever wins the majority of votes in the state is awarded all 4 electoral votes. Their chosen electors then vote for president and vice president. Although electors are pledged to their candidate and running mate, they are not obligated to vote for them. An elector who votes for someone other than his or her candidate is known as a faithless elector.

The electors of each state and the District of Columbia met on December 15, 2008, to cast their votes for president and vice president. The Electoral College itself never meets as one body. Instead the electors from each state and the District of Columbia met in their respective capitols.

The following were the members of the Electoral College from the state. All 4 were pledged to Barack Obama and Joe Biden:
 Maryellen Goodwin
 Charlene Lima
 John McConnell
 Mark Weiner

See also
 United States presidential elections in Rhode Island

References

Rhode Island
2008
2008 Rhode Island elections